A Debt of Honour may refer to:
 A Debt of Honour (1922 film), British
 A Debt of Honour (1921 film), German

See also
 Debt of Honour, a 1936 British drama film
 Debt of Honor, a 1994 novel by Tom Clancy